John Francis Ebdon (16 February 1876 – 1 November 1952) was an English cricketer. He was a right-handed batsman and a right-arm slow bowler who played for Somerset. He was born in Milverton, Somerset and died in Burley-in-Wharfedale.

Ebdon made a single first-class appearance for the side, during the 1898 season, against Gloucestershire. Ebdon made two catches during the match, including that of Test cricketer Jack Board.

Ebdon's brothers, Edward and Percy Ebdon also played first-class cricket.

External links
John Ebdon at Cricket Archive

1876 births
1952 deaths
English cricketers
Somerset cricketers
People from Milverton, Somerset